Was or WAS may refer to:
 Was, a past-tense form of the English copular verb to be

People
 David Was (born c. 1952), the stage name of multi-instrumentalist and songwriter David Weiss
 Don Was (born 1952), the stage name of bass guitarist, record producer, and recording executive Donald Fagenson

In arts and entertainment
 Was (novel), a 1992 novel by Geoff Ryman
 "Was", a short story in William Faulkner's Go Down, Moses
 Was??, a musical composition by Folke Rabe
 Was (Not Was), an American pop group led by David and Don Was
 Axis & Allies Naval Miniatures: War at Sea, a strategy game by Wizards of the Coast
 We Are Scientists, an American indie rock band

Software
 IBM WebSphere Application Server
 SAP NetWeaver Application Server
 Windows Activation Services, a container for hosting WCF services

In reference to Washington, D.C.
 All airports serving the Washington, D.C. area (IATA airport code)
 Washington Union Station (Amtrak station code)
 The city’s major professional sports teams
 Washington Commanders of the National Football League
 Washington Wizards of the National Basketball Association
 Washington Capitals of the National Hockey League
 Washington Nationals of Major League Baseball

Other uses
 Was-sceptre, the Egyptian hieroglyph for "power" and a type of sceptre
 Was (horse), an Irish Thoroughbred racehorse
 We Are Singaporeans, a Singaporean quiz game show
 Wiskott–Aldrich syndrome, an X-linked recessive disease
 Worked All States, an amateur radio award issued by the American Radio Relay League
 Western Asia
 World Association for Sexual Health

See also
Wass (disambiguation)
WA (disambiguation)